The snail kite (Rostrhamus sociabilis) is a bird of prey within the family Accipitridae, which also includes the eagles, hawks, and Old World vultures. Its relative, the slender-billed kite, is now again placed in Helicolestes, making the genus Rostrhamus monotypic. Usually, it is placed in the milvine kites, but the validity of that grouping is under investigation.

Description

There is very limited sexual dimorphism, with the female averaging only 3% larger than the male. They have long, broad, and rounded wings, which measure  each.

The adult male has dark blue-gray plumage with darker flight feathers. The legs and cere are red. The adult female has dark brown upperparts and heavily streaked pale underparts. She has a whitish face with darker areas behind and above the eye. The legs and cere are yellow or orange. The juvenile is similar to an adult female, but the crown is streaked. Adults have red or orangish-brown irises, while juveniles have dark brown irises.

It flies slowly with its head facing downwards, looking for its main food, the large apple snails. For this reason, it is considered a molluscivore.

Taxonomy
Lerner and Mindell (2005) found R. sociabilis sister to Geranospiza caerulescens, and that those two along with Ictinea plumbea were basal to both the Buteogallus and Buteo clades. They concluded that Rostrhamus belonged in Buteoninae (sensu stricto) and not in Milvinae, but noted that more investigation was needed.

Distribution
The snail kite breeds in tropical South America, the Caribbean, and central and southern Florida in the United States. It is resident all-year in most of its range, but the southernmost population migrates north in winter and the Caribbean birds disperse widely outside the breeding season.

Breeding
It nests in a bush or on the ground, laying three to four eggs.

Conservation

The snail kite is a locally endangered species in the Florida Everglades, with a population of less than 400 breeding pairs. Research has demonstrated that water-level control in the Everglades is depleting the population of apple snails. However, this species is not generally threatened over its extensive range.

In fact, it might be locally increasing in numbers, such as in Central America. In El Salvador, it was first recorded in 1996. Since then, it has been regularly sighted, including immature birds, suggesting a resident breeding population might already exist in that country. On the other hand, most records are outside the breeding season, more indicative of post-breeding dispersal. In El Salvador, the species can be observed during the winter months at Embalse Cerrón Grande, Laguna El Jocotal, and especially Lago de Güija. Pomacea flagellata apple snails were propagated in El Salvador between 1982 and 1986 as food for fish stocks, and it seems that the widespread presence of high numbers of these snails has not gone unnoticed by the snail kite.

In the Everglades
Due to the drainage and habitat destruction of the Everglades, they were one of the first species put on the US Fish and Wildlife Service's endangered species list on 11 March 1967. The snail kite continued to decline, reaching a population of less than 800 in 2007. Their population gradually rebounded after the invasive snail species Pomacea maculata began to flourish in the Everglades wetlands and served as a new food source for the snail kites, reaching a count of 3,000 snail kites in 2022. Everglades conservation efforts over the course of 30 years and costing over 20 billion USD also contributed to restoring the snail kites' habitats' native vegetation and flow of water in marshes.

Diet
This is a gregarious bird of freshwater wetlands, forming large winter roosts. Its diet consists almost exclusively of apple snails, especially the species Pomacea paludosa in Florida, and species of the genus Marisa.

Snail kites have been observed eating other prey items in Florida, including crayfish in the genus Procambarus, crabs in the genus Dilocarcinus, black crappie, small turtles and rodents. It is believed that snail kites turn to these alternatives only when apple snails become scarce, such as during drought, but further study is needed. On 14 May 2007, a birdwatcher photographed a snail kite feeding at a red swamp crayfish farm in Clarendon County, South Carolina.

The presence of the large introduced Pomacea maculata in Florida has led the snail kites in North America to develop larger bodies and beaks to better eat the snail, a case of rapid evolution. These non-native snails provide a better food source than the smaller native snails and have had a positive effect on the kites' populations.

References

External links
 
 
 Snail Kite Information at Great Florida Birding & Wildlife Trail
 
 
 
 
 
 

Birds described in 1817
Birds of Cuba
Birds of El Salvador
Birds of Mexico
Birds of South America
Birds of the Yucatán Peninsula
Higher-level bird taxa restricted to the Neotropics
Kites (birds)
snail kite
Native birds of the Southeastern United States
Taxa named by Louis Jean Pierre Vieillot